Viburnum burejaeticum, the Manchurian viburnum, is a species of flowering plant in the family Viburnaceae. It is native to Mongolia, Manchuria, the Korean Peninsula, and the Russian Far East.

References

burejaeticum
Flora of Mongolia
Flora of Manchuria
Flora of Amur Oblast
Flora of Khabarovsk Krai
Flora of Primorsky Krai
Flora of Korea
Plants described in 1862